Foley Park Halt was the first stop on the GWR Kidderminster to Bewdley loop line which now forms part of the Severn Valley Railway. It was located in the Kidderminster suburb of Foley Park where the railway went under the A451 Stourport Road. Facilities included a single wooden platform, a ticket booth and a Pagoda Platform Shelter.

History
Foley Park Halt opened in January 1905 and was originally situated to the south of the line.  In 1925 the halt was relocated to the north side of the line to accommodate sidings for the British Sugar factory at Foley Park.

The halt closed in 1970 when public services between Bewdley and Kidderminster ended. When SVR services started operating in 1984, the halt was not reopened.

See also
Kidderminster Town railway station
Severn Valley Railway

Sources 

http://www.miac.org.uk/sugar.htm
http://www.miac.org.uk/foleypark.htm

Further reading

Disused railway stations in Worcestershire
Railway stations in Great Britain opened in 1905
Railway stations in Great Britain closed in 1970
1905 establishments in England
1970 disestablishments in England
Former Great Western Railway stations